Leucine-rich repeat LGI family member 2 is a protein that in humans is encoded by the LGI2 gene.

References

Further reading